Henry M. Ashton was a lawyer in Illinois who served in the state legislature. He lost reelection to Robert R. Jackson and contested the outcome in 1913. He was also involved in a dispute over legal fees with Cook County.

References

Members of the Illinois House of Representatives
20th-century American lawyers
Illinois lawyers
20th-century American politicians